Longtan may refer to several places:

Burma
Longtan, Langhko, Burma

Mainland China
Longtan Dam (龙滩大坝), dam in Guangxi
Longtan District, Jilin City (龙潭区), Jilin City, Jilin
Longtan Park (龙潭公园), Beijing

Subdistricts (龙潭街道)
 Longtan, Guiyang, a subdistrict of Guiyang County, Hunan.
Longtan Subdistrict, Beijing, in Dongcheng District
Longtan Subdistrict, Nanjing, in Qixia District
Longtan Subdistrict, Jilin City, in Longtan District, Jilin City
Longtan Subdistrict, Chengdu, in Chenghua District

Towns (龙潭镇)
Longtan, Huoqiu County, Anhui
Longtan, Fuling District, Chongqing
Longtan, Youyang County, in Youyang Tujia and Miao Autonomous County, Chongqing
Longtan, Fujian, in Yongding County
Longtan, Jiexi County, Guangdong
Longtan, Longmen County, Guangdong
Longtan, Bobai County, Guangxi
Longtan, Henan, in Tanghe County
Longtan, Huayuan County, Hunan
Longtan, Jiahe County, Hunan
Longtan Town, Taoyuan, Hunan
Longtan, Xupu, in Xupu County, Hunan
Longtan, Jiangxi, in Gao'an
Longtan, Xiuyan County, in Xiuyan Manchu Autonomous County, Liaoning
Longtan, Zigong, in Gongjing District, Zigong, Sichuan
Longtan, Butuo County, Sichuan
Longtan, Xuanwei, Yunnan

Townships (龙潭乡)
Longtan Township, Anhui, in Qianshan County, Anhui
Longtan Township, Chongqing, in Shizhu Tujia Autonomous County
Longtan, Zhuzhou
Longtan Township, Hunan, in Zhuzhou County
Longtan Township, Liaoning, in Beipiao
Longtan Township, Guangyuan, in Lizhou District, Guangyuan, Sichuan
Longtan Township, Qu County, in Qu County, Sichuan
Longtan Township, Mojiang County, in Mojiang Hani Autonomous County, Yunnan
Longtan Township, Yangbi County, in Yangbi Yi Autonomous County, Yunnan
Longtan Township, Yuanjiang County, in Yuanjiang Hani, Yi and Dai Autonomous County, Yunnan
Longtan Li and Dai Ethnic Township (龙潭彝族傣族乡), Simao District, Pu'er, Yunnan

Taiwan
Longtan District, Taoyuan (龍潭區), district in Taoyuan
Longtan Lake, a lake in Longtan District (for which the district was named)

Vietnam
See Long Tân (disambiguation)

Other uses
Long Tan (footballer) (born 1988), Chinese footballer
Longtan Dam, a large roller-compacted concrete (RCC) gravity dam on the Hongshui River in Tian'e County of the Guangxi Zhuang Autonomous Region, China

See also
Longton (disambiguation)